Morna A. Wood was an American politician from Sundance, Wyoming who served a single term in the Wyoming House of Representatives. She was elected in 1914, and represented Crook-Campbell County from 1915 to 1917 as a Democrat in the 13th Wyoming Legislature. Wood represented Crook-Campbell County alongside Lyman Ellsbury and Frank Johnstone.

Notes

References

External links
Official page at the Wyoming Legislature

Year of birth missing
Year of death missing
20th-century American women politicians
Democratic Party members of the Wyoming House of Representatives
Women state legislators in Wyoming
People from Sundance, Wyoming